Jyutping is a romanisation system for Cantonese developed by the Linguistic Society of Hong Kong (LSHK), an academic group, in 1993. Its formal name is the Linguistic Society of Hong Kong Cantonese Romanization Scheme. The LSHK advocates for and promotes the use of this romanisation system.

The name Jyutping (itself the Jyutping romanisation of its Chinese name) is a contraction consisting of the first Chinese characters of the terms Jyut6jyu5 (meaning "Yue language") and ping3jam1 ( "phonetic alphabet", also pronounced as "pinyin" in Mandarin).

Despite being intended as a system to indicate pronunciation, it has also been employed in writing Cantonese as an alphabetic language—in effect, elevating Jyutping from its assistive status to a written language.

History
The Jyutping system departs from all previous Cantonese romanisation systems (approximately 12, including Robert Morrison's pioneering work of 1828, and the widely used Standard Romanization, Yale and Sidney Lau systems) by introducing z and c initials and the use of eo and oe in finals, as well as replacing the initial y, used in all previous systems, with j.

In 2018, it was updated to include the -a and -oet finals, to reflect syllables recognized as part of Cantonese phonology in 1997 by the Jyutping Work Group of the Linguistic Society of Hong Kong.

Initials

Finals 

 Only the finals m and ng can be used as standalone nasal syllables.
 Referring to the colloquial pronunciation of these words.
 Used for elided words in casual speech such as a6 in 四十四 (sei3a6sei3), elided from sei3 sap6 sei3.
 Used for onomatopoeias such as oet6 for belching or goet4 for snoring.

Tones 

There are nine tones in six distinct tone contours in Cantonese. However, as three of the nine are entering tones, which only appear in syllables ending with p, t, and k, they do not have separate tone numbers in Jyutping (though they do in Cantonese Pinyin; these are shown in parentheses in the table below). A mnemonic which some use to remember this is 「風水到時我哋必發達」or “Feng Shui [dictates that] we will be lucky.”

Comparison with Yale romanisation 
Jyutping and the Yale Romanisation of Cantonese represent Cantonese pronunciations with the same letters in:
 The initials: b, p, m, f, d, t, n, l, g, k, ng, h, s, gw, kw, w.
 The vowel: aa (except when used alone), a, e, i, o, u, yu.
 The nasal stop: m, ng.
 The coda: i, u, m, n, ng, p, t, k.
But they differ in the following:
 The vowels eo and oe represent  and  respectively in Jyutping, whereas the eu represents both vowels in Yale.
 The initial j represents  in Jyutping whereas y is used instead in Yale.
 The initial z represents  in Jyutping whereas j is used instead in Yale.
 The initial c represents  in Jyutping whereas ch is used instead in Yale.
 In Jyutping, if no consonant precedes the vowel yu, then the initial j is appended before the vowel. In Yale, the corresponding initial y is never appended before yu under any circumstances.
 Jyutping defines three finals not in Yale: eu , em , and ep .  These three finals are used in colloquial Cantonese words, such as deu6, lem2, and gep6.
 To represent tones, only tone numbers are used in Jyutping whereas Yale traditionally uses tone marks together with the letter h (though tone numbers can be used in Yale as well).

Comparison with Cantonese pinyin 
Jyutping and Cantonese Pinyin represent Cantonese pronunciations with the same letters in:
 The initials: b, p, m, f, d, t, n, l, g, k, ng, h, s, gw, kw, j, w.
 The vowel: aa, a, e, i, o, u.
 The nasal stop: m, ng.
 The coda: i (except for its use in the coda  in Jyutping; see below), u, m, n, ng, p, t, k.
But they have some differences:
 The vowel y represents  in Cantonese Pinyin whereas both yu (used in the nucleus) and i (used in the coda of the final -eoi) are used in Jyutping.
 The initial dz represents  in Cantonese Pinyin whereas z is used instead in Jyutping.
 The initial ts represents  in Cantonese Pinyin whereas c is used instead in Jyutping.
 To represent tones, the numbers 1 to 9 are usually used in Cantonese Pinyin, although the use of 1, 3, 6 to replace 7, 8, 9 for the checked tones is acceptable. However, only the numbers 1 to 6 are used in Jyutping.

Examples 

Sample transcription of one of the 300 Tang Poems:

Jyutping input method
The Jyutping method refers to a family of input methods based on the Jyutping romanization system.

The Jyutping method allows a user to input Chinese characters by entering the jyutping of a Chinese character (with or without tone, depending on the system) and then presenting the user with a list of possible characters with that pronunciation.

List of Jyutping keyboard input utilities
Online Jyutping Input Method
MDBG Type Chinese
Red Dragonfly
LSHK Jyutping for Mac (Mac OS 9 and macOS) (The page also includes Yale input version 0.2)
Hong Kong Cantonese 2010 (via Microsoft Office IME 2010)
Canton Easy Input
Cantonese Phonetic IME (also called 'Cantonese Phonetic IME (CPIME) Jyutping' in Windows 10)
RIME
Gboard

See also

 Cantonese phonology

Footnotes

Further reading

External links 
 Jyutping Pronunciation Guide
 : Learning the phonetic system of Cantonese
 Chinese Character Database (Phonologically Disambiguated According to the Cantonese Dialect)
 The CantoDict Project is a dedicated Cantonese-Mandarin-English online dictionary which uses Jyutping by default
 MDBG free online Chinese-English dictionary (supports both Jyutping and Yale romanization)

Languages of Hong Kong
Cantonese romanisation
Writing systems introduced in 1993
Romanization of Chinese